Rutenberg is a municipality in the northeastern German state Brandenburg. It may also refer to:

asteroid 20478 Rutenberg
Rutenber Motor Company, which supplied engines and components to Geronimo Motor Company.
Jim Rutenberg
Pinchas Rutenberg

See also
Rothenberg (disambiguation)